The Fujifilm X series is a line of digital cameras produced by Fujifilm. The series encompasses fixed lens and interchangeable lens mirrorless cameras and premium compact point-and-shoot cameras aimed at consumer, enthusiast and professional photographers. The X series is part of the larger FinePix range of digital cameras from Fujifilm.

The X series models use either APS-C or  inch sensors.

X series model lines 
Since its introduction with the X100 in 2011, the X series has grown to encompass a wide variety of designs. These lines can be broken out into the following categories or model lines.

APS-C sensor 
The following lines are united by their use of APS-C-sized sensors measuring 25.1×16.7 mm, with an aspect ratio of 3:2 and Ø31.15 mm field diameter. They are listed here within each category in the order in which the initial model of each type was introduced.

Fixed lens 
 X100 line — These models have a fixed focal length 23mm prime lens and a hybrid electronic/ optical viewfinder in a traditional rangefinder body style. The line originated with the Fujifilm FinePix X100 released in March 2011. The X100 has an EXR CMOS sensor while the subsequent models use proprietary X-Trans sensors.  the X100 line includes five models.
 X/ XF line (APS-C) — The X70, which debuted in early 2016, is similar to the X100 line in that it has a fixed prime lens and an X-Trans APS-C sensor. Differences include lack of a viewfinder, a wider angle lens, and a tilting screen. The X70's successor, the XF10 is similar, but relies on a Bayer sensor.  these are the only two models in this lineage.

Interchangeable lens 
  X-Pro line — The X-Pro series are essentially an X100 adapted to utilize interchangeable lenses. Like the X100 they have a hybrid electronic/ optical viewfinder. The first X-Trans sensor was introduced in the X-Pro1, which debuted in March 2012. Three X-Pro models have been produced .
 X-E line — The X-E models offer an interchangeable lens mount, rangefinder styling, X-Trans sensors and electronic viewfinders in a more compact package than the X-Pro line.  five X-E cameras have been produced.
 X-M line — The X-M1, released in 2013, is the sole X-M model. This camera is basically an X-E minus the viewfinder, forcing the user to compose shots using the LCD display. Unlike future X-A models, the X-M1 has an all metal body. Due to this design, the X-M1 is the smallest camera in the X series which uses interchangeable lenses and has an X-Trans sensor.
 X-A line – Like the X-M1 the X-A line doesn't have a viewfinder. The initial X-A model, the Fujifilm X-A1 which was introduced in 2013, is visually nearly identical to the X-M1, but has a different sensor. and utilizes a poly-carbonate body in place of all metal construction. The X-A series use sensors equipped with a Bayer filter which uses a different pattern of color capturing pixels than the X-Trans filter used on the higher end X series cameras.  the line has since expanded to include seven models.
 X-T line — The X-T models represent the X series' first move away from the rangefinder styling after the earlier small-sensor X-S1. It adopt a DSLR-style layout with the electronic viewfinder above the lens mount and a more pronounced grip. The X-T models feature the same X-Trans sensors as the rest of the series besides the X-A line. The first X-T camera, the Fujifilm X-T1 was released in 2014 and has since expanded to include ten models. The X-T models can be further split into three sub-lines, with the single-digit models — X-T1, X-T2, etc. — targeted at professionals with features like weather sealing, the two-digit models — X-T10, etc. — aimed at advanced amateurs, and the three-digit models  — X-T100, etc. — catering to budget-minded consumers and using Bayer rather than X-Trans sensors.
 X-H line —  On the February 15, 2018 Fujifilm introduced the X-H1, offering a larger DSLR-style body  than the X-T line along with a more aggressive grip and advanced features like sensor-shift image stabilization. Like the X-T line, the X-H Line relies on an X-Trans sensor. On May 31, 2022, Fujifilm introduced the X-H2s.
 X-S line (APS-C) — The X-S designation, which previously had been used for a small-sensor bridge camera, the X-S1, was revived with the X-S10 in October 2020. This new X-S camera is a DSLR-style offering which slots between the X-T3 and the X-T30 and features in-body image stabilization. It is differentiated from the X-T line in using a PASM-style command dial rather than the individual dials to set shutter speed and ISO used by many of the other X series lines.

Small sensor 
The following lines are united by their use of  inch sensors measuring 8.8 by 6.6mm, with an aspect ratio of 4:3. In addition to a shared sensor size, all of these model lines utilized fixed (non-interchangeable) zoom lenses. They are listed here in the order in which the initial model of each type was introduced.

 X line (small sensor) — The X10 was the first model in this line when it debuted in late 2011. Models in this line feature a fixed zoom lens and a rangefinder-style body with an optical tunnel viewfinder. There have been three such models .
 X-S line (small sensor) — The X-S1 is the sole model in this category. It is a DSLR-styled, super-zoom, bridge camera with a fixed lens.
 XF line (small sensor) — The XF1 was released in September 2012. It is a compact, fixed lens zoom with no viewfinder and an EXR sensor.  it has no direct successor, although the XQ line is very similar.
 XQ line — The XQ line are compact cameras with fixed zoom lenses, X-Trans sensors and no viewfinders. The initial model, the XQ1, came out in October 2013. The XQ2 is the only other model in the line to date.

X series chronology 

		Lens: Fixed | Interchangeable  
		Sensor: 2/3" | APS-C	
		Processor:
			Bayer | 
			EXR | 
			X-Trans | 
			X-Trans II | 
			X-Trans III | 
			X-Trans IV |
			X-Trans V

X series models 

Cameras and camera bodies released by Fujifilm as a part of the X series, in chronological order:

 Fujifilm FinePix X100: Prime lens compact digital camera with custom APS-C sized CMOS sensor and hybrid viewfinder, and fixed 23 mm 2.0 Fujinon lens. Announced at Photokina, the X100 launched globally in March 2011.
 Fujifilm X10: Advanced compact with a  12 megapixel (MP), and a high-definition 2.0 wide-angle and 2.8 telephoto Fujinon 4x manual zoom lens (28–112 mm). Introduced Fujifilm's EXR-CMOS sensor, a variation on the Bayer filter pattern. Announced September 1, 2011. Succeeded by Fujifilm X20.
 Fujifilm X-S1: Advanced enthusiast's camera with the same  12 MP EXR-CMOS sensor as the X10 compact. It has a fixed 26X zoom providing range equivalent to 24–624 mm at 2.8-5.6 aperture. Announced November 24, 2011.
 Fujifilm X-Pro1: Mirrorless interchangeable-lens camera that uses the "X-Trans CMOS" sensor and the Fujifilm X-mount system of lenses. It was announced on January 10, 2012, and launched in March 2012.
 Fujifilm X-E1: Mirrorless interchangeable-lens camera which is a slimmed-down version of X-Pro1. The modifications include replacing the expensive hybrid viewfinder with an upgraded electronic viewfinder; the new EVF uses a 2.36M dot OLED unit, out-speccing the X-Pro1's 1.44M dot LCD finder. It was announced on September 6, 2012.
 Fujifilm XF1: Enthusiast's compact camera with  inch EXR-CMOS sensor and Fujinon 1.8 lens with a 4× optical zoom (25 mm–100 mm equivalent). It was announced on September 17, 2012.
 Fujifilm X20: Replacement for the X10 enthusiast compact camera with  inch X-Trans CMOS II sensor, EXR Processor II and a new advanced optical viewfinder. It was announced on January 7, 2013. Succeeded by Fujifilm X30.
 Fujifilm X100S: Redesigned version of the X100 with new sensor-based phase detection. It was announced January 7, 2013. Introduced Fujifilm's Digital Split Image technology, allowing manual focus that appears to the user similar to a rangefinder camera's coincidence or split-image function.
 Fujifilm X-M1: Announced June 25, 2013. It is the smallest X series model with an APS-C X-Trans sensor and an articulating screen.
 Fujifilm X-A1: Lowest priced interchangeable lens camera in the line-up, without X-Trans sensor, announced on September 17, 2013.
 Fujifilm X-E2: Successor to the X-E1, with an X-Trans CMOS II sensor (same as the X100S), larger  screen with higher resolution (1.04 M), Digital Split Image technology, and wi-fi. Announced on October 18, 2013.
 Fujifilm XQ1: Premium compact camera with X-Trans CMOS II sensor. Announced on October 18, 2013.
 Fujifilm X-T1: Mirrorless interchangeable-lens camera with a weather-sealed body, X-Trans CMOS II sensor, and tilting LCD screen. Announced on January 27, 2014. Also the first X-series camera with an optional battery grip, and the first camera from any manufacturer to fully support UHS-II SD cards.
 Fujifilm X30: Successor to the X20. Announced August 26, 2014.
 Fujifilm X100T: Successor to the X100S. Announced September 10, 2014.
 Fujifilm X-A2: Mirrorless interchangeable-lens camera. Successor to the X-A1. Announced January 15, 2015.
 Fujifilm XQ2: Successor to the XQ1.
 Fujifilm X-T10: Mirrorless interchangeable-lens camera. Mass market version of X-T1.
 Fujifilm X-T1 IR: A full-spectrum version of the X-T1 useful for capturing infrared photographs. It was developed and marketed specifically for law enforcement (forensic) as well as medical and scientific applications.
 Fujifilm X-Pro2: Mirrorless interchangeable-lens camera, successor to the X-Pro1, with a new 24 MP X-Trans III sensor and higher resolution EVF. Announced January 15, 2016.
 Fujifilm X-E2S: Mirrorless interchangeable-lens camera, minor update to the X-E2. Announced January 15, 2016.
 Fujifilm X70: Smaller version of the Fujifilm X100T, with an 18.5 mm lens (28 mm-equivalent) rather than a 23 mm (35 mm-equivalent) on the X100/S/T. Announced January 15, 2016.
 Fujifilm X-T2: Upgraded model from X-T1 with similar weather-sealed body but same sensor and image processor as X-Pro2. Announced July 7, 2016.
 Fujifilm X-A3: Upgraded model from the X-A2, with 24.2 MP CMOS sensor, 11 types of film simulations, and rear LCD with touchscreen.
 Fujifilm X-A10: Entry-model camera, detuned from X-A2. Without accessory shoe. Sold worldwide except Japan.
 Fujifilm X100F: Successor to X100T. Equipped with the same sensor and processor as X-Pro2. Focus lever on the back of the body, built-in ISO dial on the top.
  Fujifilm X-T20: Successor to X-T10. Same sensor and processor as X-T2. The tilt LCD on the back of the body becomes a touch panel; it also supports touch-autofocus and touch-shooting.
 Fujifilm X-E3: Mirrorless interchangeable-lens camera, successor to X-E2s. Equipped with the same sensor and processor as X100F, X-Pro2, X-T2 and X-T20. The D-Pad has been replaced by swiping motions on the Touchscreen. Announced September 7, 2017.
  Fujifilm X-A5: Successor to X-A3. Improved autofocus with new CMOS sensor and processor, new high dynamic range, and 4K movie shooting modes. New kit lens with XC 15 mm–45 mm 3.5-5.3 OIS PZ. Announced January 31, 2018 and on sale beginning on February 15, 2018.
 Fujifilm X-A20: Similar specifications to X-A10 with an addition of a touch sensitive LCD display. The X-A20 was limited to primarily Asian markets.
 Fujifilm X-H1: Based on X-T2, newly equipped with In-Body Image Stabilizer (IBIS),10000 compute per second, stabilizing is effective with all genuine lenses. Announced February 15, 2018 and available from March 1, 2018.
 Fujifilm X-T100: Largely based on the X-A5 and is nearly identical to X-T20, equipped with an electronic viewfinder, a fully articulating touchscreen (3-way tilt) and a hybrid autofocus. Announced 2018 May 24.
 Fujifilm XF10: Successor to X70, but equipped with the same 24 megapixel Bayer sensor as the X-A5 & X-T100. Announced on July 19, 2018.
 Fujifilm X-T3: Successor to X-T2, but equipped with a new 26 MP X-Trans IV sensor. 3" tilting screen. ISO sensitivity to 51200. 4K/60P 4:2:2 10-bit (HDMI) and 4K/60P 4:2:0 10-bit (SD Card). Announced September 6, 2018.
 Fujifilm X-T30: Successor to X-T20, but equipped with 26 megapixel sensor. 3" tilting screen. ISO sensitivity to 51200. Announced February 14, 2019.
 Fujifilm X-A7: Successor the X-A5, equipped the new 24.2MP APS-C CMOS image sensor. 3.5" fully articulating touch screen. It can record 4K videos is 30P. Announced September 12, 2019.
 Fujifilm X-Pro3: Mirrorless interchangeable-lens camera, successor to the X-Pro2, with the 4th generation 26.1MP X-Trans. Announced October 23, 2019.
 Fujifilm X-T200: Successor the X-T100, equipped the new 24.2MP APS-C CMOS image sensor. 3.5" fully articulating touch screen. It features a digital gimbal and a digital image stabilization. It can record 4K videos is 30P. Announced January 23, 2020.
 Fujifilm X100V: Successor to X100F. Equipped with the 4th generation 26.1MP X-Trans. A new two-way tilting touchscreen LCD that folds down flush with the back of the bod is also equipped in the camera. Announced February 4, 2020.
 Fujifilm X-T4: Successor to X-T3, equipped with fully articulating screen, new battery and in-body stabilization. Announced on February 26, 2020.
 Fujifilm X-S10: First of its generation, a mid-range camera equipped with a in-body image stabilization and a fully articulating screen. Announced on October 15, 2020.
 Fujifilm X-E4: Mirrorless interchangeable-lens camera, successor to X-E3. Thinner than its predecessor and contains no grip. Announced on January 27, 2021.
 Fujifilm X-T30 II: An update to the X-T30. Compared to the X-T30, the new model has a higher resolution LCD and additional memory to improve overall performance. Announced September 2, 2021 and will be available in late October 2021.
 Fujifilm X-H2S: The X-H2S has a resolution of 26 MP. It is the successor of the X-H1 from 2018. X-H2S is the first digital camera to incorporate the new X-trans CMOS 5 HS imaging sensor, which is both stacked and backside-illuminated, allowing it to read data four times faster than Fujifilm's previous X-Trans CMOS 4 sensor.
 Fujifilm X-H2: The X-H2 is the latest camera teased by Fujifilm on May 31, 2022 and released on September 9, 2022. It featured a new X-Trans CMOS 5 HR 40 MP non-stacked sensor.
 Fujifilm X-T5: Successor to X-T4, equipped with the 40 MP sensor which debuted in the X-H2. Announced November 2, 2022.

Fujifilm X-mount lenses 

All X-series cameras with interchangeable lenses use Fujifilm X-mount lenses. The first such lenses were introduced along with the X-Pro1 in early 2012. The original three lenses for the new system were a set of fixed-focal length prime lenses: an 18mm f/2 wide-angle, a 35mm f/1.4 standard and a 60mm f/2.4 macro lens. The first X-mount zoom lens, an 18-55mm f/2.8–4, was released later in 2012.

 Fujifilm has released over 35 lenses for the system, all of which offer autofocus. In addition, a host of third-party companies have extended the selection to over 200 lenses, many of which are manual focus only.

X series accessories
A wide variety of accessories for X series cameras and X-mount lenses have been introduced, both from Fujifilm and from third party suppliers. These include lens mount adapters; conversion lenses; camera grips; camera cases; lens hoods, caps, and filters; flashes and flash accessories; microphones; remote releases; and batteries and chargers.

Lens adapters 
Due to the short 17.7mm flange focal distance of the Fujifilm X mount, lenses from a vast array of other systems can be adapted for use on X series cameras. An adapter to allow use of Leica M-mount lenses on X-mount cameras is offered by Fujifilm. This adapter provides a way to set the focal length of the lens which will appear in image Exif info, and correct for common color shift and vignetting problems when using M-mount lenses on digital cameras.

Conversion lenses 
Wide conversion lens WCL-X100

Camera grips 
Fujifilm hand grip HG-XPro1

Camera cases 
Fujifilm leather softcase

Flashes and accessories 
Fujifilm EF-X20 shoe-mount flash a dedicated TTL flash with 20 mm equivalent angle using the built-in defuser. Guide number 20' (6.1 m) ISO100 at 50 mm position.

References

External links

See also 
Fujinon
Fujifilm GFX series
Fujifilm G-mount

X series